James Robert Mathes was the fourth bishop of the Episcopal Diocese of San Diego. After studies at Sewanee: The University of the South and Virginia Theological Seminary, Mathes was ordained to the diaconate in 1991 and to the priesthood in 1992. He was consecrated on March 5, 2005, by Gary Richard Lillibridge, Richard Sui On Chang and his predecessors, Robert M. Wolterstorff and Gethin Benwil Hughes.  He resigned effective July 1, 2017.

See also 

 List of Episcopal bishops of the United States
 Historical list of the Episcopal bishops of the United States

External links 
Mathes elected fourth bishop of San Diego
San Diego's Episcopal Bishop Plans to Retire

Living people
Sewanee: The University of the South alumni
20th-century American Episcopalians
21st-century American Episcopalians
Year of birth missing (living people)
Episcopal bishops of San Diego